Death of a Salesman is a 1996 British made-for-television film adaptation of the 1949 play of the same name by Arthur Miller. It was directed by David Thacker and starred Warren Mitchell as Willy Loman.  Mitchell reprised the role for which he had won the West End theatre Laurence Olivier Award for Actor of the Year in a Revival in 1979.

External links
 

1996 television films
1996 films
1996 drama films
Films set in Brooklyn
British films based on plays
Films with screenplays by Arthur Miller
1990s English-language films
Films directed by David Thacker
1990s British films
British drama television films